1 Prince's Terrace is a residential building in the Scottish city of Glasgow. In 1970, the building was included in the Scottish monument lists as an individual monument in Category A, the highest monument category.

History 
The building was built around 1870. The Scottish architect James Thomson provided the design. The local starch producer James Morrice bought house number 1 in 1895. Morrice, who lived in the building until 1932, had the interior completely redesigned around 1900.

Description 
The two-story building is the corner house between Prince's Terrace and Queen's Place in the northwest of Glasgow. The building is designed in the historic Italianate style. Its north-facing main facade is four axes wide. A short front staircase leads to the double-leaf entrance door. It is equipped with side windows, fighter window, architrave and on consoles bearing crown decorations. On the left there is a beveled, two-story promontory. It ends with a flat, cast iron railing. Cornices divide the facade horizontally. The arched dormers are designed with archivolts in relief. A cast iron balustrade runs between the dormers. The roof is covered with slate.

References 

Category A listed buildings in Glasgow